Pecan Hill is a city in Ellis County, Texas, United States. The population was 626 at the 2010 census, down from 672 at the 2000 census.

Geography

Pecan Hill is located in northern Ellis County at  (32.485411, –96.783041). It is bordered to the north by the city of Red Oak.

Demographics

As of the census of 2000, there were 672 people, 226 households, and 200 families residing in the city. The population density was 345.0 people per square mile (133.1/km). There were 234 housing units at an average density of 120.1/sq mi (46.3/km). The racial makeup of the city was 93.75% White, 1.19% African American, 0.30% Native American, 4.32% from other races, and 0.45% from two or more races. Hispanic or Latino of any race were 8.78% of the population.

There were 226 households, out of which 44.2% had children under the age of 18 living with them, 73.9% were married couples living together, 12.8% had a female householder with no husband present, and 11.1% were non-families. 9.3% of all households were made up of individuals, and 3.1% had someone living alone who was 65 years of age or older. The average household size was 2.97 and the average family size was 3.14.

In the city, the population was spread out, with 29.5% under the age of 18, 7.0% from 18 to 24, 28.4% from 25 to 44, 28.1% from 45 to 64, and 7.0% who were 65 years of age or older. The median age was 39 years. For every 100 females, there were 98.8 males. For every 100 females age 18 and over, there were 88.1 males.

The median income for a household in the city was $55,000, and the median income for a family was $57,596. Males had a median income of $43,125 versus $29,432 for females. The per capita income for the city was $21,195. About 3.1% of families and 2.6% of the population were below the poverty line, including 2.0% of those under age 18 and none of those age 65 or over.

Education
The City of Pecan Hill is served by the Red Oak Independent School District.

References

External links
 City of Pecan Hill official website

Cities in Ellis County, Texas
Cities in Texas
Dallas–Fort Worth metroplex